Constituent Assembly elections were held in Peru on 18 June 1978. The American Popular Revolutionary Alliance emerged as the largest party, winning 37 of the 100 seats.

Results

See also
Constituent Assembly (Peru)

References

Revolutionary Government of the Armed Forces of Peru
Elections in Peru
Peru
1978 in Peru